Manto Ke Afsanay is a collection of short stories in Urdu by Saadat Hasan Manto . It was first published in 1940.

Background
Manto Ke Afsanay was first published in 1940 from Lahore. This is the author Manto’s second collection of original short stories.  His first publication was titled Atish Paray.  Included in this second collection are new stories and also some reprints of stories such as Tamasha (Spectacle), Taqat ka imtahan and Inqilabi (Revolutionary). The reprints are necessary as these stories were excluded in the later editions of the first publication.

Content
The stories in this collection include:

 Naya Qanun (New Law or New Constitution)
 Shaghl (Amusement)
 Khushiya (Khushiya)
 Banjh (Barren)
 Na’rah (The Slogan)
 Shah nasin par (On the balcony)
 Us ka pati (Her Husband)
 Tamasha (Spectacle) 
 Taqat ka imtahan (Test of Strength) 
 Inqilabi (Revolutionary) 
 Istudant yubyan kaimp (Student union camp)
 Sharabi (Drunkard)
 Shushu (Shushu)
 Mera aur uska intiqam (My revenge and hers)
 Mausam ki sharat (the playfulness of the season)
 Begu (Begu)
 Phaha (Bandage)
 Mantar (Mantra)
 Tehri lakir (Crooked line)
 Mom batti ke ansu (The tears of the wax candle)
 Diwali ke diye (The diwali lights)
 Pahchan (Discernment)
 Darpok (Coward)
 Das rupaye (Ten Rupees)
 Misiz di Kosta (Mrs. Dicosta)
 Blauz (Blouse)

Themes
The themes of Manto’s stories show considerable variation. Stories such as Inqilabi (Revolutionary),  Sharabi (Drunkard) and Istudant yubyan kaimp (Student union camp) deal with political issues with characters who identify as revolutionaries or activists. Naya Qanun (New Law) explores the character of Ustaad Mongu, a tonga-driver and the political atmosphere in India in the backdrop of the commencement of Government of India Act 1935. Tamasha (Spectacle), first published in Rusi Afsare (Russian Stories) and later in Atish Paray dealt with the Jallianwala Bagh massacre.

Manto explores the theme of social realism in stories such as Shaghl (Amusement), Na’rah (The Slogan) and Das rupaye (Ten Rupees). Influenced from Maxim Gorky’s Twenty-six Men and a Girl, Shaghl deals with the abduction of a girl by some rich men. In Das rupaye (Ten Rupees), he depicts the life of Sarita, an innocent young girl who works as a part time prostitute.

Notes

References

Cited sources

 

Indian short stories
Saadat Hasan Manto
Urdu-language books
1940 short story collections
Progressive Writers' Movement